Kericho East Constituency  - (1963-1988) the now defunct constituency was among the post colonial constituencies in the current Kericho County. It was later changed to Kipkelion Constituency in the General Election of 1988.Kipkelion Constituency was later split into two, that is Kipkelion West and Kipkelion East Constituencies  for the General Election of 2013 inline with the New Constitution of Kenya (2010).

Members of Parliament

Related Links 

 Kipkelion Constituency
 Kipkelion East Constituency
 Kipkelion West Constituency

References 

Former constituencies of Kenya
Kericho County